Baccara is a 1935 French comedy film directed by Yves Mirande. The film's music was composed by Jean Lenoir.

Cast
 Marcelle Chantal
 Lucien Baroux
 Jules Berry
 Marcel André
 Paul Clerget
 Léon Arvel
 Emile Saulieu
 Claude Marty
 Jean Gobet
 Pierre Piérade
 Pierre Sarda
 Michel Serrault

References

External links
 

1935 films
1930s French-language films
French crime comedy films
1930s crime comedy films
French black-and-white films
1935 comedy films
Films directed by Yves Mirande
1930s French films